The World Snooker Tour makes annual awards in several categories, including player of the year, and established a Hall of Fame in 2011.

The Association of Snooker Writers, a grouping of journalists who wrote about snooker, was founded in 1981. In 1983, they instituted awards for players and others associated with the game, and made another set of awards in 1984. From 1985, the awards were taken over by the World Professional Billiards and Snooker Association. In 1998, the journalists' group was reformed as the Snooker Writers' Association, and the awards were in that body's name for several years. The awards are now administered by the World Snooker Tour.

Player of the year and miscellaneous awards

Services to snooker award

Achievement of the year

Special awards

Hall of fame
The World Snooker hall of fame was instituted in 2011, with eight winners of multiple world snooker championships as the initial inductees.

Notes

Reference 

Sources

External links
Who's in the Snooker Hall of Fame (World Snooker)

Snooker-related lists